The 1956 Democratic National Convention nominated former Governor Adlai Stevenson of Illinois for president and Senator Estes Kefauver of Tennessee for vice president. It was held in the International Amphitheatre on the South Side of Chicago, Illinois August 13–August 17, 1956. Unsuccessful candidates for the presidential nomination included Governor W. Averell Harriman of New York, Senator Lyndon B. Johnson of Texas, and Senator Stuart Symington of Missouri.

As the unsuccessful 1952 Democratic Party presidential nominee, Stevenson had the highest stature of the active candidates and was easily renominated on the first ballot. Former President Harry S. Truman, whose support for Stevenson in '52 helped secure him the nomination, was opposed to his renomination in 1956, instead favoring Harriman. It did no good, as Truman was no longer a sitting President, and Stevenson was nominated on the first ballot.

After Stevenson decided not to reselect his 1952 running mate John Sparkman, the convention was marked by a "free vote" for the vice presidential nomination in which the winner, Kefauver, defeated Senator John F. Kennedy of Massachusetts. The vice presidential nomination vote, which required three separate ballots, was (as of 2020) the last multi-balloted contest held at a quadrennial political convention of any major U.S. political party for the presidency or vice presidency.

The Democratic convention preceded the 1956 Republican convention in the Cow Palace, San Francisco, California. At the GOP gathering, President Dwight D. Eisenhower and Vice President Richard Nixon were nominated for reelection.

Scheduling and logistics of convention
The 1956 Democratic convention was held before that year's Republican National Convention. This was unusual, as since 1864, in every election but 1888, Democrats had held their convention second. It has become an informal tradition that the party holding the White House (which, accordingly, in 1956 had been the Republican Party) hosts their convention second, but it is unclear when this tradition began. Democrats had held the White House and held their conventions second between 1936 and 1952, but it is unclear whether they scheduled their conventions second in these years because of their White House incumbency, or whether they scheduled them second because it was traditional that Democratic National Conventions had been held after the Republican National Convention.

This was the second election in which conventions were televised live coast-to-coast. Television had, by 1956, become the dominant medium of popular news coverage. To adjust to the medium of television, the convention was condensed in length compared to previous years, with daytime sessions being largely eliminated and the amount of welcoming speeches and parliamentary organization speeches being decreased (such as seconding speeches for vice-presidential candidates, which were eliminated). Sessions were also scheduled in order to maximize exposure to prime-time audience.

The 1956 Democratic Platform
With regard to the growing Civil Rights Movement, the platform called for voting rights, equal employment opportunities, and the desegregation of public schools. Relative to the Republicans, the Democrats favored greater reliance on the United Nations, multilateral disarmament, more spending for programs relating to social welfare and agriculture, "a full and integrated program of development, protection, management and conservation of natural resources," and the use of peaceful atomic energy.

Presidential nomination
Candidates:

The roll call, as reported in Richard C. Bain and Judith H. Parris, Convention Decisions and Voting Records, pp. 294–298:

Vice Presidential nomination
The highlight of the 1956 Democratic Convention came when Stevenson, in an effort to create excitement for the ticket, made the surprise announcement that the convention's delegates would choose his running mate. This set off a desperate scramble among several candidates to win the nomination.  A good deal of the excitement of the vice-presidential race came from the fact that the candidates had only one hectic day to campaign among the delegates before the voting began. The two leading contenders were Senator Kefauver, who retained the support of his primary delegates, and John F. Kennedy, who, as a first term Senator from Massachusetts, was relatively unknown at that point. Kennedy surprised the experts by surging into the lead on the second ballot; at one point he was only 15 votes shy of winning. However, a number of states then left their "favorite son" candidates and switched to Kefauver, giving him the victory. Kennedy then gave a gracious concession speech. The narrow defeat raised his profile and helped Kennedy's long-term presidential chances; by losing to Kefauver he avoided any blame for Stevenson's expected loss to Eisenhower in November. , this was the last time any presidential or vice presidential nomination of either the Democratic or Republican parties, went past the first ballot.

Candidates 

The vote totals in the vice presidential balloting are recorded in the following table, which also comes from Bain & Parris.

Election outcome
On November 6, Stevenson and Kefauver lost the election to President Eisenhower and Vice President Nixon in a landslide.

See also
 1956 Republican National Convention
 1956 United States presidential election
 History of the United States Democratic Party
 1956 Democratic Party presidential primaries
 List of Democratic National Conventions
 United States presidential nominating convention

References

External links
 Democratic Party Platform of 1956 at The American Presidency Project
 Stevenson Nomination Acceptance Speech for President at DNC (transcript) at The American Presidency Project
 Video of Stevenson nomination acceptance speech for President at DNC (via YouTube)
 Audio of Stevenson nomination acceptance speech for President at DNC
 Video of Kefauver nomination acceptance speech for Vice President at DNC (via YouTube)

1956 United States presidential election
1956 in Illinois
20th century in Chicago
Political conventions in Chicago
Democratic Party of Illinois
Political events in Illinois
Democratic National Conventions
1956 conferences
August 1956 events in the United States